Union Township is one of ten townships in Marshall County, Indiana, United States. As of the 2010 census, its population was 3,088 and it contained 1,938 housing units.

History
Union Township was organized in 1840. It was likely named after Union County, Indiana, the former home of some of the early settlers.

The East Shore Historic District and Norris Farm-Maxinkuckee Orchard are listed on the National Register of Historic Places. Woodbank was delisted in 2014.

Geography

Cities, towns, villages
 Culver

Unincorporated towns
 Burr Oak at 
 Hibbard at 
 Maxinkuckee at 
 Rutland at 
(This list is based on USGS data and may include former settlements.)

Cemeteries
The township contains these five cemeteries: Burr Oak, Cromley, Masonic, Washington and Zion.

Airports and landing strips
 Culver Airport
 Fleet Field
 Jacks Field

Lakes
 Lake Maxinkuckee
 Houghton Lake
 Lost Lake
 Moore Lake

Major highways

Education
 Culver Community Schools Corporation

The township is served by the Culver-Union Township Public Library.

Political districts
 Indiana's 2nd congressional district
 State House District 17
 State Senate District 5

References
 
 United States Census Bureau 2008 TIGER/Line Shapefiles
 IndianaMap

External links
 Indiana Township Association
 United Township Association of Indiana
 City-Data.com page for Union Township

Townships in Marshall County, Indiana
Townships in Indiana